Addanki is a Municipal city in Prakasam district of the Indian State, Andhra Pradesh. Addanki North is the mandal headquarters of Addanki mandal in Addanki revenue division.

Geography 
It has an average elevation of 24 meters (82 ft).
It is located between Guntur and Ongole and Chialakaluripet and Narasaraopet and Vijayawada

Addanki is located in the bank of Gundlakamma river. This river is the main resource of drinking water for Addanki,

History 
Addanki is an important region in the  Reddy kings.

Addanki inscription 

The inscription, a replica of the original one which is excavated near Thousand Pillar Temple of Addanki, stands testimony to a flourishing Telugu literature much before the available literary texts. Locals believe that this is the first poem ever to be written in Telugu. Starting with the Boya campaign, Pandaranga got victories in all military campaigns of his master Gunaga Vijayaditya III. The inscription spoke about the donation of land by the king to him for his successful military exploits. A noted scholar-poet of those times, he had translated Sanskrit poems into Telugu.

Historical Temples
 1000 Stambala Temple ( near to Bhavani center Junction . This is now destroyed )
 Sri Prasannajayaneya Swamy Temple, Singarakonda ( Ongole-Hyderabad Highway)  from Addanki Bus stop

Politics 

Addanki is an assembly constituency in Andhra Pradesh. Addanki, Ballikurava, Korisapadu, Panguluru, and Santamaguluru are the 5 mandals that come under Addanki Assembly Constituency. Addanki assembly comes under Bapatla parliament constituency. Present MLA Gottipati Ravi Kumar AND Present MP Nandigam Suresh (Bapatla).

Transport

Road 
Addanki is a well connected with all major cities and towns via road due to its geographical position between Guntur, Ongole() and Chilakaluripet and Narasaraopet.

Railway 
The nearest railway stations to addanki is Ongole Railway Station which is at  distance and another railway station Narasaraopet Railway Station which is at  distance.

References 

Towns in Prakasam district
Mandal headquarters in Prakasam district